San Sicario Fraiteve is a venue built for the 2006 Winter Olympic. It seated 6,160 spectators, including 5,660 seated and 500 standing, for the women's alpine skiing downhill, super-G, and combined.

The venue is located in Cesana.

References
2006 Winter Olympics official report. Volume 3. pp. 79–80.

Venues of the 2006 Winter Olympics
Olympic alpine skiing venues
Ski areas and resorts in Italy
Sports venues in Italy